Baima is a town under the administration of Pujiang County, Jinhua, Zhejiang, China. , it has 19 villages under its administration:
Wufeng Village
Lifeng Village
Yongfeng Village
Jingwu Village
Songxi Village
Qingtang Village
Lianfeng Village
Chaiwu Village
Changdi Village
Liuzhai Village
Xiazhang Village
Haoshu Village
Lantang Village
Qunxin Village
Dongping Village
Lianjiang Village
Gaoping Village
Tongxin Village
Shuangxi Village

References 

Township-level divisions of Zhejiang
Pujiang County, Zhejiang